Krishna Srinivas (1913–2007) was an Indian writer of English literature, known for his spiritualistic poems. He was the president of the World Poetry Society Intercontinental (WPSI). The Government of India awarded him the Padma Bhushan, the third highest civilian award, in 2004.

Biography
Krishna Srinivas, born on July 26, 1913 at Srirangam in the present day Tiruchirappalli district of the south Indian state of Tamil Nadu (then known as Madras Presidency), did his college education at University of Madras from where he graduated in 1932 before starting his career as a clerk at the All India Radio in Delhi; he would later become a feature writer at AIR. However, he returned to Chennai to work as a freelance journalist till he founded a journal, POET, in 1960. Later, he was also involved in the formation of the World Poetry Society Intercontinental ad served as an editorial consultant to the International Who's Who In Poetry And Poets' Encyclopaedia, published by International Biographical Centre, Cambridge.

The Government of India awarded him the third highest civilian honor of the Padma Bhushan in 2004. He died on December 14, 2007, at the age of 94.

Bibliography

References

Further reading

External links
 
 

Recipients of the Padma Bhushan in literature & education
Indian poets
1913 births
2007 deaths
People from Tamil Nadu
People from Tiruchirappalli district
University of Madras alumni